The Cerro del Pueblo Formation is a geological formation in Coahuila, Mexico whose strata date back to the Late Cretaceous. Dinosaur remains are among the fossils that have been recovered from the formation. The formation is believed to correlate with the Baculites reesidesi and Baculites jenseni ammonite zones, which dates it to 73.63-72.74 Ma.

Dinosaurs

Ornithischians 
Remains of the following ornithischians have been found in the formation:

Ankylosaurs

Ceratopsians

Ornithopods

Thescelosaurids

Saurischians
Remains of the following saurischians have been found in the formation:

Theropods

Other Fossils

Pterosaurs

Turtles

Other vertebrates 
Fish
 Lepisosteus sp.
 Amiidae indet.

Fossil eggs
 Porituberoolithus sp.
 Spheroolithus sp.
 ?Prismatoolithus sp.

Mammals
 Multituberculata indet.

See also 
 List of dinosaur-bearing rock formations
 List of fossiliferous stratigraphic units in Mexico

References

Bibliography

Further reading 

 J. L. Gudiño Maussán, F. J. Aguilar, and R. Hernández-Rivera. 2018. Aplicación de fotogrametría digital para el registro de las huellas de dinosaurio de la Formación Cerro del Pueblo (Campaniano tardío), Coahuila, México [Application of digital photogrammetry for recording dinosaur footprints of the Cerro del Pueblo Formation (late Campanian), Coahuila, Mexico]. Boletín de la Sociedad Geológica Mexicana 70(2):307-324
 D. Brinkman, M. C. Aguillon-Martinez, J. H. Hutchison and C. M. Brown. 2016. Yelmochelys rosarioae gen. et sp. nov., a stem kinosternid (Testudines; Kinosternidae) from the Late Cretaceous of Coahuila, Mexico. PaleoBios 33(30601):1-20
 A. A. Ramírez-Velasco, R. Hernández-Rivera, and R. Servin-Pichardo. 2014. The hadrosaurian record from Mexico. In D. A. Eberth & D. C. Evans (ed.), Hadrosaurs 340-360
 D. Brinkman, M. C. Aquillon-Martinez, C. A. De Leon Dávila, H. Jamniczky, D. A. Eberth and M. Colbert. 2009. Euclastes coahuilaensis sp. nov., a basal cheloniid turtle from the late Campanian Cerro del Pueblo Formation of Coahuila State, Mexico. PaleoBios 28(3):76-88
 H. E. Rivera-Sylva and B. Espinosa-Chávez. 2006. Ankylosaurid (Dinosauria: Thyreophora) osteoderms from the Upper Cretaceous Cerro de Pueblo Formation of Coahuila, Mexico. Carnets de Géologie/Notebooks on Geology Letter(2006/02):1-5
 M. Aguillon-Martinez, D. Zelenitsky, D. B. Brinkman and D. A. Eberth. 2004. Eggshell fragments from the uppermost Cerro del Pueblo Formation (Upper Cretaceous; Mexico). Journal of Vertebrate Paleontology 24(3, suppl.):33A
 D. Eberth, S. D. Sampson, R. A. Rodriguez-De La Rosa, M. Aguillon-Martinez, D. B. Brinkman and J. Lopez-Espinoza. 2003. Las Aguilas: an unusually rich Campanian-age vertebrate locale in southern Coahuila, Mexico. Journal of Vertebrate Paleontology 23(3):47A
 R. A. Rodríguez-de la Rosa, D. A. Eberth, D. B. Brinkman, S. D. Sampson, and J. López-Espinoza. 2003. Dinosaur tracks from the late Campanian Las Aguilas locality, southeastern Coahuila, Mexico. Journal of Vertebrate Paleontology 23(3):90A
 J. I. Kirkland and M. C. Aguillón-Martínez. 2002. Schizorhiza: a unique sawfish paradigm from the Difunta Group, Coahuila, Mexico. Revista Mexicana de Ciencias Geológicas 19(1):16-24
 R. A. Rodriguez-de la Rosa and S. R. S. Cevallos-Ferriz. 1998. Vertebrates of the El Pelillal locality (Campanian, Cerro del Pueblo Formation), southeastern Coahuila, Mexico. Journal of Vertebrate Paleontology 18(4):751-764
 R. Hernández-Rivera. 1997. Mexican dinosaurs. In P. J. Currie & K. Padian (ed.), Encyclopedia of Dinosaurs 433-437
 R. A. Rodriguez-de la Rosa and S. R. S. Cevallos-Ferriz. 1994. Upper Cretaceous Zingiberalean fruits with in situ seeds from Southeastern Coahuila, Mexico. International Journal of Plant Sciences 155(6):786-805
 R. Hernández and J. I. Kirkland. 1993. The rediscovery of a rich uppermost Campanian dinosaur locality in the Cerro del Pueblo Fm., Coahuila, Mexico. Journal of Vertebrate Paleontology 13(3, suppl.):41A
 G. E. Murray, D. R. Boyd, J. A. Wolleben and J. A. Wilson. 1960. Late Cretaceous fossil locality, eastern Parras Basin, Coahuila, Mexico. Journal of Paleontology 34(2):368-370

Geologic formations of Mexico
Upper Cretaceous Series of North America
Campanian Stage
Cretaceous Mexico
Mudstone formations
Sandstone formations
Siltstone formations
Conglomerate formations
Limestone formations
Ichnofossiliferous formations
Ooliferous formations
Fossiliferous stratigraphic units of North America
Paleontology in Mexico